Mohammed Bin Hamad Indoor Hall (Arabic: صالة محمد بن حمد الهتمي), also known as the Al-Arabi Sports Club Hall, is a multi-purpose Hall in Doha, Qatar. It is currently used mostly for volleyball and basketball matches. The volleyball, basketball, futsal, and handball teams of Al-Arabi SC play there. The stadium has a seating capacity of 2,000 people. The hall served as one of the two venues for the 2013–14 Qatari Volleyball League season.

Events hosted
The stadium was used as the main venue for table tennis during the 2006 Asian Games. It was also used as a training facility during the 2009 FIVB Volleyball Men's Club World Championship. The inaugural edition of the Qatar Volleyball Super Cup took place in the stadium in December 2014. In July 2015, the venue hosted the Senior International Men’s Friendly volleyball tournament. The tournament featured Qatar, India, Cameroon and Egypt.

References

Multi-purpose stadiums in Qatar
Sports venues in Doha
Table tennis in Qatar